Sich-1M is a Ukrainian spacecraft, an artificial satellite of Earth, constructed for remote sensing of Earth.

Developed by Yuzhnoye Design Office and manufactured by Yuzhmash.

Sich-1M was launched on December 24, 2004, at 13:20 from the Plesetsk cosmodrome (Russia) using the Cyclone-3 launch vehicle together with MK-1TS microsatellite. Both satellites placed into incorrect orbits due to premature third stage cutoff.

The satellite was in orbit until April 15, 2006.

Purpose 
Sich-1M was designed to receive information simultaneously in the optical, infrared and microwave ranges. The complex of research equipment installed on the spacecraft allowed to study the atmosphere of Earth and the World Ocean, monitoring the hydrological and ice conditions, vegetation and soil cover of the land, etc.

See also 

 Space program of Ukraine
 2004 in spaceflight
 Sich-1
 Sich-2

References

External links 
 Space experiment “Variant” onboard SICH-1M satellite 
 Sich-1M at eoPortal
 Sich 1M at Gunter's Space Page
 Sich-1M
 SICH, SICH-1M

Spacecraft launched in 2004
December 2004 events
2004 in Ukraine
Satellite meteorology
Satellites of Ukraine
Yuzhmash satellites and probes